Der Tag an dem die Welt unterging (English: The Day the World Went Down)  is the second album by German deathcore band, We Butter the Bread with Butter. It was released on May 14, 2010 through Redfield Records.

Track listing

Personnel
We Butter the Bread with Butter
 Tobias "Tobi" Schultka — vocals, drums, programming
 Marcel "Marci" Neumann — guitars, programming
 Maximilian Pauly Saux – bass guitar
 Can Özgünsür – drums

References

2010 albums
German-language albums
We Butter the Bread with Butter albums